Deh Musa or Deh Moosa, also rendered as Deh Musi, may refer to:
 Deh Musa, Hamadan
 Deh Musa, Kermanshah
 Deh Musa, Sistan and Baluchestan